Burmese Gurkhas are a group of Nepali language speaking Burmese people of Khas/Gurkha ethnic group living in Myanmar (formerly Burma). While the Gurkhas have lived in Burma for many centuries, it was during the British rule in Burma that the majority of the Gurkha migrated from Nepal.

The estimated population of Gurkha is nearly 1 million. The majority of Gurkha now reside in Yangon (Rangoon), Mandalay, Pyin U Lwin, Mogok, Tamu, Kalaymyo, Taunggyi, and other parts of the country.

History and demography

Like many other people who reside in Myanmar and who have their origin in Nepal, the majority of Gurkha came along with the British administration. Many Gurkhas served during the Second World War in the Burma Campaign, especially as rear guard units for the British retreat from Burma

After Burma's independence in 1948, the Gurkhas joined the infant Burma Army. Many Gurkhas served in the new republic's various campaigns against ethnic insurgents and the Kuomintang invasions. The Gurkha were considered key assets of the Burmese Army in the 1950s. This was also the soldier named Suk Bahadur Rai that won the highest honor of Tatmadaw, The Aung San Thuriya Medal.

Culture

Many Gurkha in Myanmar practice Hinduism and Buddhism. There are a few Gurkha Buddhist and Hindu temples in the cities around Kachin State, Shan State, Yangon and Mandalay. Gurkha form a large minority in Myitkyina, Mogok and the hill station of Pyin U Lwin (Maymyo).

Language
Most Gurkha typically speak Nepali and Burmese languages.

Education
The Gurkha place high importance on education, and they represent a disproportionately high share of those with advanced (medical, engineering or doctorate) degrees in Burma.

Notable Gurkha people in Burma
Private Aung San Thuriya Suk Bahadur Rai – No.4 Burma Regiment (4th Gurkha) Myanmar Army. – recipient of the Aung San Thuriya award, the highest gallantry award in Myanmar.
Suk Bahadur (Burmese: ဗဟာဒူး) is a Burmese footballer who served as the captain of Myanmar national football team (1952–1970). He is considered as the greatest Burmese footballer that ever lived for the tremendous success he brought to country's football. He's also a major in Myanmar Army

Corporal Thiha Thura Man Bahadur Thapa – No.4 Burma Regiment (4th Gurkha) Myanmar Army
Lt. Colonel Zeya Kyawhtin Thura Lachhuman Rai- No.4 Burma Regiment (4th Gurkha), Myanmar Army
Colonel Zeya Kyawhtin Tanka Dhoj -Director General of Hotel and Tourism Department under Ne Win's government.
Lt. Colonel  Raj Bahadhur Lama-(A 1)  Eastern Command , Myanmar Army
Major Zeyakyawhtin Bhagiman Subba – No.4 Burma Regiment (4th Gurkha), Myanmar Army
Assistant Director Arun Kumar- Internal Revenue Departmant, Ministry of Finance, Union of Myanmar
Professor of Chemistry Attar Singh Chettry (M.Sc.), Mandalay University, Myanmar
Gannes Basnet  (Advocate ) first Gurkha Candidate for Myanmar Parliament
Cherry Myae Maung Tin Tun (Writer)
Nyein Thazin (Taekwando) two gold, three silver and two bronze medals
Nanda Soe @ Maha Nandar Gyawali Kick boxer
Nandar Gyawali, Podcaster, human rights activist and feminist activist

References

Further reading
May Myo Chit Swe, "Myanmar Pyi Phwar Gurkha", 2000 November (in Burmese).
Scott of The Shan Hills, Edited By G.E Mitton(Lady Scott)
Report of Frontier Areas Committee of Enquiry, Part 2,1947
Burma Gazetteer,28.6.1948
Ruby Mines District Gazetteer
New Times of Burma,7.6.1948
New Times of Burma,10.6.1948
The Hundred Days of Burma, Lt.MACHOTON

External links
Myanmar
Demographics of Nepal

Ethnic groups in Myanmar
 
Nepalese diaspora by country
Nepalese diaspora in Asia
Gurkhas